Turner's Hall Wood is a national forest and nature reserve in the parish of Saint Andrew in Barbados.

References

External links
 Turners Hall Wood. Barbados.org.

Parks in Barbados
Saint Andrew, Barbados